The 1909 North Sligo by-election was held on 5 August 1909.  The by-election was held due to the death of the incumbent Irish Parliamentary MP, Patrick Aloysius McHugh.  It was won by the Irish Parliamentary candidate Thomas Scanlan, who was unopposed.

References

1909 elections in Ireland
1909 elections in the United Kingdom
By-elections to the Parliament of the United Kingdom in County Sligo constituencies
Unopposed by-elections to the Parliament of the United Kingdom (need citation)